Fluvanna is an unincorporated community in Scurry County, Texas, United States.  It lies just south of the Llano Estacado high atop the caprock, where Farm-to-Market Road 1269 and Ranch Road 612 intersect.

Fluvanna is named for a surveyor's home county — Fluvanna County, Virginia. Fluvanna was established by realty promoters  who knew where the Roscoe, Snyder and Pacific Railway would terminate to satisfy its charter's 50-miles-of-line requirement.

Fluvanna's importance lessened when the railroad closed the station in 1941 and major highways bypassed the area. The population dropped from a high of 500 in 1915 to 180 in the 2000 Census.  The post office has closed in Fluvanna, yet the area still retains the 79517 zip code.  Several wind power generation companies (i.e.: GE) have office and shop locations in town, there is one convenience store, but no gas station in Fluvanna.

Gallery

See also
Caprock Escarpment
Double Mountain Fork Brazos River
Duffy's Peak
Farm to Market Road 669
Mushaway Peak
Salt Fork Brazos River

References

External links

Public domain photos of the Llano Estacado

Unincorporated communities in Scurry County, Texas
Unincorporated communities in Texas